Eupithecia longipalpata is a moth in the  family Geometridae. It is found from coastal British Columbia south to California.

The wingspan is about 21 mm. Adults are light brownish with an ochreous tinge. Adults are on wing from late June to July.

The larvae feed on the needles of Abies grandis, Abies amabilis, Abies lasiocarpa, Pseudotsuga menziesii and Pseudotsuga menziesii var. glauca, Tsuga heterophylla, Tsuga mertensiana, Thuja plicata, Picea sitchensis and Pinus contorta var. latifolia. Full-grown larvae reach a length of 20 mm. There are two colour morphs. The common morph is green with a yellowish green head. The second morph is brown. Larvae can be found from April to early June and again from mid August to October. Pupation takes place in early June.

References

Moths described in 1876
longipalpata
Moths of North America